Systemography or SGR is a process where phenomena regarded as complex are purposefully represented as a constructed model of a general system. It may be used in three different ways: conceptualization, analysis, and simulation. The work of Jean-Louis Le Moigne is associated with systemography.

Systemography modeling consists of building, simultaneously, the process' operational, informational and decisional systemographs in modeling phase. Ettore Bresciani Filho (2001) recommends the following order in systemography modeling:

Define the border of the system to be modeled, characterizing the border's processors responsible for the system's inputs and outputs.
Build the operational systemograph of the production system, disposing in a block diagram the production process' different stages, representing each with an operational processor.
Build the informational systemograph of the production system, disposing in a block diagram the different stages of the information's generation, transformation and communication, representing each with an informational processor.
Build the decisional systemograph of the production system, disposing in a block diagram the different stages of the decision's process representing each one with decisional processors.
Classify the processors of the systemographs in categories, types and levels; building a comparative table of processors.
Identify the possible forces fields influences, such as culture and organizational climate.
Relate the problems in priority order, applying problem analysis techniques to identify and find solutions for each one of them.
Use mathematical methods for the modeling the processors as the system as a whole.
Propose the solution of the problems in the form of recommendations and procedures to be adopted. 
To systemograph consists, in a few words, in building a model, physical or mathematical, static or dynamic, analytical or numeric of a phenomenon that can be noticed as complex by the analyzer that intends to model it.

The elaboration of the operational systemographs (presenting the operations involved in the process), of the informational systemographs (where the information flow is highlighted) and of the decisional systemographs (where the decisions are shown) allows, during the activity analysis, to evaluate it and to improve it.

These systemographs allow to observe and to eliminate redundancies and cycles that are (or not) important for the process, providing its systemic visualization, identifying points to allow its rationalization, increase of flexibility, and activation.

History
The systemography was studied and presented theoretically by Jean-Louis LeMoigne (1990; 1994) in his Théorie du Système Général (1994). Bresciani Filho presents, in his works and through his students, a practical use of the systemography concepts, particularly for systems of production and of information.

See also

 Cybernetics
 Dynamical system
 Emergence
 Glossary of systems theory
 Holism
 List of types of systems theory
 Meta-system
 Multidimensional system
 Open and closed systems in social science
 Social complexity
 Social rule system theory
 Systemantics
 Systemics
 Systems engineering
 Systems psychology
 Systems theory
 Systems theory in anthropology
 Systems theory in archaeology
 Systems theory in political science
 World-systems theory

Notes

References

BRESCIANI FILHO, Ettore. Método de estudo de sistema – sistemografia. Texto Didático – Unicamp – Universidade Estadual de Campinas e PUC – Pontifícia Universidade Católica de Campinas: texto publicado na Revista do Instituto de Informática da PUC Campinas, em 2001.
DURAND, Daniel. La systémique. Collection Que sais-je?, n. 1795. 9. ed. Paris: PUF – Presses Universitaires de France, 2002. 127 p.
FERREIRA, Vitorio Henrique. Reorganização do atendimento ao cliente em uma empresa de saneamento básico. Dissertação (Mestrado em Gerenciamento de Sistemas de Informação). Campinas: Pontifícia Universidade Católica de Campinas, Instituto de Informática, 1999. 109 p.
KINTSCHNER, Fernando Ernesto. Método de reorganização de processos com apoio na engenharia de sistemas. Tese (Doutorado em Engenharia Mecânica). Campinas: Universidade Estadual de Campinas, Faculdade de Engenharia Mecânica, 2003. 146 p. Disponível em <http://libdigi.unicamp.br/document/?code=vtls000293075>. Accesso em: 25 March 2010.
KINTSCHNER, Fernando Ernesto. Metodologia de reestruturação da área de administração de materiais em empresa industrial. Dissertação (Mestrado em Gerenciamento de Sistemas de Informação). Campinas: Pontifícia Universidade Católica de Campinas, Instituto de Informática, 1998. 53 p.
LE MOIGNE, Jean-Louis. La modélisation des systèmes complexes. Afcet Systèmes. Paris: Dunod, 1990. 178 p.
LE MOIGNE, Jean-Louis. La théorie du système général: théorie de la modélisation. 4. ed. Paris: PUF – Presses Universitaires de France, 1994. 338 p.
 POUVREAU David (2013). "Une histoire de la 'systémologie générale' de Ludwig von Bertalanffy – Généalogie, genèse, actualisation et postérité d'un projet herméneutique", Doctoral Thesis (1138 pages), Ecole des Hautes Etudes en Sciences Sociales (EHESS), Paris : http://tel.archives-ouvertes.fr/tel-00804157
SALLES, Valério Maronni. Gestão de projetos de infra-estrutura para implantação de sistemas de informação. Dissertação (Mestrado em Gerenciamento de Sistemas de Informação). Campinas: Pontifícia Universidade Católica de Campinas, Instituto de Informática, 2003. 127 p.
SILVA, Íris Bento. Modelo de sistema integrado de produto e processo com melhoria contínua da qualidade. Tese(Doutorado em Engenharia Mecânica). Campinas: Universidade Estadual de Campinas, Faculdade de Engenharia Mecânica, 2000. 239 p. Disponível em: <http://libdigi.unicamp.br/document/?code=vtls000203984>. Accesso em: 25 March 2010.
THIMMIG, Rolando Antonio. Reorganização do sistema de matrículas de uma faculdade. Dissertação (Mestrado em Gerenciamento de Sistemas de Informação). Campinas: Pontifícia Universidade Católica de Campinas, Instituto de Informática, 2000. 147 p.
THIMMIG, Rolando Antonio. Aplicação da sistemografia para a elaboração da proposta de um método de acreditação de instituição de saúde. Tese(Doutorado em Engenharia Mecânica – área de Concentração: Materiais e Processos de Fabricação). Campinas: Universidade Estadual de Campinas, Faculdade de Engenharia Mecânica, 2008. 228 p. Disponível em <http://libdigi.unicamp.br/document/?code=vtls000437590>. Accesso em: 25 March 2010.

Epistemology